D'Leanu Arts (born 27 May 2003) is a Dutch professional footballer who plays for Jong PSV in the Eerste Divisie.

Club career
Arts started playing youth football with PSV in 2010. He signed his first professional contract with PSV in 2020 aged 17. In the summer of 2022 he extended his contract with PSV into 2023 and began training with Jong PSV. Arts was credited with his first Eerste Divisie assist for Jong PSV against Jong AZ on 12 December 2022.

International career
Arts has represented the Dutch under-17 national team. He is also eligible to represent Indonesia.

References

External links
 

Living people
2003 births
Dutch footballers
Association football defenders
Jong PSV players
Eerste Divisie players
People from Veghel
Dutch people of Indonesian descent
Netherlands youth international footballers